John McKnight was an American football and basketball coach. He served as the head football coach at Texas Christian University (TCU) in 1922, compiling a record 2–5–3. During the same academic year, 1922–23, he was also the school's head basketball coach, tallying a mark of 3–13. McKnight previously worked as an assistant football coach at TCU under William L. Driver during the 1920 and 1921 seasons.

Head coaching record

Football

References

Year of birth missing
Year of death missing
TCU Horned Frogs football coaches
TCU Horned Frogs men's basketball coaches